On 9 March 2022, India accidentally fired a BrahMos missile originating from Sirsa, Haryana that crashed into Mian Channu, Khanewal District, Punjab, Pakistan.

Incident
On 9 March 2022, at 6:43 pm, Air Defence Operations Centre of the Pakistan Air Force (PAF) picked up a high-speed flying object inside Indian territory. "From its initial course, the object suddenly manoeuvred towards Pakistani territory and violated Pakistan's air space, ultimately falling near Mian Channu at 6:50 pm", according to Director General Maj Gen Babar Iftikhar of the Inter-Services Public Relations (ISPR).

The crash near Mian Channu in Punjab, Khanewal District, Pakistan, caused damage to civilian property but no civilian casualties. The missile travelled 124 kilometres inside Pakistani territory in three minutes and 44 seconds, according to Air Vice Marshall Tariq Zia. The missile with its point of origin reported to be near Sirsa, Haryana entered into Pakistan from Suratgarh, Rajasthan.

Earlier media reports suggested that an aircraft had crashed in the area.

Reaction

Pakistan
Pakistan strongly condemned the incident and warned India against recurrence of any such incident in the future.

On 11 March 2022, the Foreign Office of Pakistan summoned the Indian envoy to register Pakistan's protest over the unprovoked airspace violation by an Indian origin "super-sonic flying object", saying such "irresponsible incidents" reflected India's "disregard for air safety and callousness towards regional peace and stability".

On 12 March 2022, the Foreign Office of Pakistan issued a statement demanding "a joint probe to accurately establish the facts surrounding the incident" while rejecting New Delhi's decision to hold an internal inquiry.

India
On 11 March 2022, 48 hours after the incident, the Indian Defense Ministry said “a technical malfunction led to the accidental firing of a missile” and that it was "deeply regrettable". India also said that they have ordered a high-level Court of Enquiry to look into the incident. While still unconfirmed by both the Indian and Pakistani authorities, sources say that the missile fired was a BrahMos. According to Times of India, conventional missiles like the BrahMos also don't have “self-destruct mechanisms” like the ones available on India's strategic or nuclear missiles.

On 23 August 2022, 3 Indian Airforce officers were primarily held responsible for the incident for "deviation from the Standard Operating Procedures" and their services were terminated by the Indian government with immediate effect.

The Pakistani Ministry of Foreign Affairs later issued a statement rejecting the Indian investigations and maintained it's demand for a joint investigation of the incident.

Others
China's Foreign Ministry spokesman Zhao Lijian called for “a thorough investigation" into the incident while urging India and Pakistan to “strengthen information sharing" and establishing "a notification mechanism in time to avoid the recurrence of such incidents and to prevent miscalculation”.
US State Department Spokesperson Ned Price while responding to a question about the incident, said that "we have no indication" that India's missile launch into Pakistan was "anything other than an accident".

References

2022 in international relations
2022 in Punjab, Pakistan
2020s in Haryana
March 2022 events in India
March 2022 events in Pakistan
India–Pakistan relations
Khanewal District
Sirsa, Haryana